Sree Ayyappanum Vavarum is a 1982 Indian Malayalam-language Hindu mythological film directed and edited by N. P. Suresh and written by Purushan Alappuzha and Alappuzha Karthikeyan from a story by Purushan. The film stars Prem Nazir, Srividya, M. G. Soman and Nalini. The music for the film was composed by A. T. Ummer.

Plot

Cast 

S. Babu as Lord Ayyappan
Prem Nazir as Vavar
Srividya as Vavar's wife
M. G. Soman as King of Pandhalam
Nalini
Swapna as Bhavanai
Mohanlal as Kadutha
Cochin Haneefa as Kaliyappan
Prathapachandran
Unnimary as Queen of Pandhalam
Rajkumar
Balan K. Nair as King Udayanan
Kaduvakulam Antony as Ummer
Mala Aravindan
Meena

Production 
The film was shot at Vijaya Vauhini Studios, Prasad Studios and Chitra Mahal Studios, some of the scenes were shot in the hills of Sabarimala.

Soundtrack 
The music was composed by A. T. Ummer and the lyrics were written by Poovachal Khader and Koorkkancheri Sugathan.

References

External links 
 

1980s Malayalam-language films
1982 films
Films directed by N. P. Suresh
Hindu mythological films